Cantharis rustica is a species of soldier beetle found in Europe east to central Russia.

Description
In central Europe, the adult beetles appears between May and July. Larvae are active from late summer until early spring and in March and April they pupate.

Distribution
According to GBIF records, Cantharis rustica occurs in Europe from as north as Scandinavia to the shores of the Mediterranean and from the Atlantic Ocean to central Russia.

Habitat
This beetle species has a preference for arable land.

References

Cantharidae
Insects of Europe
Insects described in 1807
Taxa named by Carl Fredrik Fallén